Karan Bhagat is an Indian entrepreneur and investor, who is the founder, CEO and MD of IIFL Wealth & Asset Management, an Indian wealth management firm. He has been listed in fortuneindia.com's 40 Under 40 list in 2016 and 2017. He was also a finalist for the EY Entrepreneur of the Year Award in 2018.

Early life and education 
He hails from a Marwari business family of Kolkata. Bhagat completed his MBA from Indian Institute of Management in 2001.

Career 
Before joining IIM, he ran a travel agency in 1996 for a brief while. Later, he joined Kotak Mahindra Bank and served as the head of Kotak Mahindra Bank's wealth management practice for Mumbai.

In April 2008, Bhagat along with his friends Yatin Shah and Amit Shah founded IIFL Wealth Management Ltd. as a unit of IIFL Holdings.

His company IIFL Wealth sold a 21.6% stake in the wealth unit to General Atlantic for ₹ 1.2 billion (USD173 million) in October 2015. As of September 2019, IIFL Wealth & Asset Management has around Rs.1,70,000 crore of assets under advice, distribution and management. He is also an angel investor in half-a-dozen startups.

Public and media appearances 
Some of his public appearances are:

Awards and recognition

References 

Indian businesspeople
Living people
Indian business executives
Year of birth missing (living people)